Nobuko Nakahara (January 5, 1929 – July 5, 2008) was a Japanese architect who reached prominence after World War II. Nakahara was one of the first women to become a licensed architect in Japan.

Biography
Nobuko Nakahara was born in Urawa, Saitama in 1929. In 1945, she matriculated to Kasei-Gakuin Special School where she was taught home economics. After graduation, Nakahara found herself dissatisfied with her course of study and resolved to pursue architecture. In 1951, she enrolled at Musashi Institute of Technology where she studied architecture.

She was president of the UIFA.

In September 1953, Nakahara, along with a number of other female architects established PODOKO, an association of women in design.

Nobuko Nakahara died on July 5, 2008, at age 79.

See also 

 Masako Hayashi
 Hatsue Yamada

References 

Japanese women architects
Tokyo Kasei-Gakuin University alumni
People from Saitama Prefecture
1929 births
2008 deaths